Evelio Arias Ramos (10 September 1966 – 4 November 2008) was a Mexican actor, comedian and singer.

Filmography

References

External links

1966 births
2008 deaths
Mexican male telenovela actors
Mexican male television actors
Mexican male film actors
Mexican male comedians
Mexican television presenters
Male actors from Tabasco
Singers from Tabasco
20th-century Mexican male actors
21st-century Mexican male actors
People from Ciudad Pemex, Macuspana
20th-century comedians
20th-century Mexican male singers